The 8th Chang-ki Cup was held from June to October 2011. Gu Li won the final by defeating Liu Xing 2 to 0.

Tournament

References

2011 in go
Go competitions in China